Tiempo de Silencio is a 1986 Spanish film directed by Vicente Aranda adapted from a well-regarded novel written by Luis Martín-Santos. It stars Imanol Arias, Victoria Abril and Francisco Rabal.

Cast
Imanol Arias as Pedro
Victoria Abril as Dorita
Francisco Rabal as Muecas
Juan Echanove as Matias
Charo López as Charo/ Matias’ mother
Joaquín Hinojosa as Cartucho
Francisco Algora as Amador
Diana Peñalver as Conchi
Blanca Apilánez as Pilar
Enriqueta Claver as Luisa

Notes

Bibliography
Cánovás Belchí, Joaquín (ed.), Varios Autores,: Miradas sobre el cine de Vicente Aranda, Murcia: Universidad de Murcia, 2000.P. Madrid
Colmena, Enrique: Vicente Aranda, Cátedra, Madrid, 1986, 
Deveney, Thomas G: Cain on Screen: Contemporary Spanish Cinema, The Scarecrow Press, 1993, 
D’Lugo, Marvin:   Guide to the Cinema of Spain, Greenwood Press,1997, 
Faulkner, Sally:  Literary Adaptations in Spanish Cinema, Tamesis Books, 2004, 
Schwartz, Ronald, The Great Spanish Films: 1950- 1990,Scarecrow Press, London, 1991,

External links

1986 films
1986 drama films
Spanish drama films
1980s Spanish-language films
Films directed by Vicente Aranda
LolaFilms films